Ivan Ristić (Serbian Cyrillic: Иван Ристић; born 10 January 1975) is a Serbian football manager and former player.

Playing career
Born in Serbia he was playing with FK Jedinstvo Paraćin when he signed with FK Vojvodina in 1997 where he played in the First League of FR Yugoslavia until 2001. He had a spell with FK Rad in 2001-2002 before moving to Hungary to play with Videoton FC. In 2005, he moved to Sweden to play with Syrianska FC in Allsvenskan.

Managerial career
After retiring, he became the coach of Syrianska FC (2012-2013), AFC United (2014-2016), Djurgårdens IF (2016-2018 ).

References

External links
 SvFF profile
 
 Ivan Ristić at Playerhistory

1975 births
Living people
Serbs of Bosnia and Herzegovina
Association football defenders
Serbian footballers
FK Vojvodina players
FK Rad players
Fehérvár FC players
Syrianska FC players
First League of Serbia and Montenegro players
Nemzeti Bajnokság I players
Allsvenskan players
Superettan players
Serbian expatriate footballers
Expatriate footballers in Hungary
Serbian expatriate sportspeople in Hungary
Expatriate footballers in Sweden
Serbian expatriate sportspeople in Sweden
Serbian football managers